Justin Thomas King (born May 11, 1987) is a former American football cornerback. King was drafted in the 4th round (101st overall) by the Rams in the 2008 NFL Draft.
He played college football at Penn State University.

High school
Justin King was a highly rated high school football recruit playing football for Gateway High School in Monroeville, Pennsylvania. King was the Gatorade Pennsylvania player of the year as a senior. He was rated as highly as the top cornerback recruit in the country in 2004, and the top football recruit in the state of Pennsylvania. He played in the 2005 U.S. Army All-American Bowl with fellow Nittany Lion Derrick Williams. King's stepfather, Terry Smith, was a receiver for Penn State from 1988 to 1991, and is currently a Penn State football coach under James Franklin. He was also an accomplished sprinter on the track and field team for two years.

College career
King arrived at Penn State as one of the most highly touted prospects of that season. He made an immediate impact as a true freshman, playing on both offense and defense in 2005. That season, he averaged 12.6 yards per rushing attempt, racking up 277 yards on 18 carries.

By 2006, he was the team's starting cornerback, playing all thirteen games. His first career interception came versus Ohio State and snapped eventual Heisman Trophy winner Troy Smith's streak of 153 attempts without an interception. King was named second-team All-Big Ten by the conference coaches that season, and was named to the 2006 Academic All-Big Ten team.

Following his junior season, King declared himself eligible for the 2008 NFL Draft, forgoing one year of college eligibility. King, an academic All-Big Ten selection, finished his degree in Letters, Arts, and Sciences in two and a half years.

Professional career

2008 NFL Draft
Despite questions over King's decision to declare himself eligible for the 2008 NFL Draft following his junior season, King made a strong showing at the NFL Scouting Combine. His 4.31-second time in the 40-yard dash was the fastest time for a defensive back, and second-fastest of all prospects, second only to running back Chris Johnson of East Carolina.

King was selected by the St. Louis Rams in the 4th round of the 2008 NFL Draft. He signed a three-year $1.52 million contract that included a $376,000 signing bonus.

2008 season
King suffered a torn ligament in his big toe in the first preseason game versus the Tennessee Titans on August 8, an injury that would keep him out for the entirety of his rookie season.

Indianapolis Colts
On June 8, 2012, King was signed by the Indianapolis Colts The Colts released King from their roster following their Week 5 win against the Packers.

Pittsburgh Steelers
On December 18, 2012, King was signed by the Pittsburgh Steelers. On June 6, 2013, King was placed on the injured reserve list. On July 2, 2013, he was released by the Steelers.

References

External links
2008 NFL Draft combine profile
GatewayGators.com - highlights from Justin King in high school

1987 births
Living people
People from Monroeville, Pennsylvania
American football cornerbacks
Players of American football from Pittsburgh
Penn State Nittany Lions football players
St. Louis Rams players
Indianapolis Colts players
Pittsburgh Steelers players